KST Live 31.08.'95 is the first live album by the Serbian punk rock band Goblini released in 1995, on compact cassette only, by the Mortal Combat records indie record label. The album features cover versions of KUD Idijoti "Pisma o ribaru Marinu, Mari i moru" and "Minijatura", Ramones "Sheena Is a Punk Rocker" and "Commando" and a version of The Clash cover of "I Fought the Law", with lyrics in Serbian entitled "Ne mogu više". The band also played Boris Novković's song "Tamara" since Jovanović was a part of Novković's backing band with guest appearance by Atheist Rap vocalist Dr. Pop on lead vocals. The cover of Demolition 23 track "Same Shit Different Day" featured Leonid Pilipović on lead vocals.

Track listing

Personnel 
 Vlada Kokotović — bass
 Zoran Jević "Fric" — drums
 Alen Jovanović — guitar
 Leo fon Punkerstain — guitar, vocals on track 18
 Branko Golubović "Golub" — vocals
 Z. Ivetić — producer, recorded by
 Fića KST — recorded by
 Žalosna Sova — artwork by [design]
 Dr. Pop — vocals on track 15

References 
 KST Live 31.08.'95 at Discogs
 EX YU ROCK enciklopedija 1960-2006, Janjatović Petar; 

1995 live albums
Goblini albums